The Valea Cărbunelui is a right tributary of the river Cerna in Romania. It discharges into the Valea lui Iovan Reservoir.

References

Rivers of Romania
Rivers of Gorj County